"Last Train Home" is the second single from Start Something, the second album by the Welsh rock band Lostprophets. This single was the band's joint highest charting in the UK, tied with "Rooftops (A Liberation Broadcast)". It remains their most successful in the United States, as it reached number one on Billboards Alternative Songs chart. "Last Train Home" was released to radio on December 27, 2003.

Release and reception
"Last Train Home" was released in December of 2003 and became the most successful song from Start Something on the rock charts and arguably the band's most recognisable and popular song. The song peaked at number one on the Billboard Alternative Songs chart and number ten on the Billboard Mainstream Rock Tracks chart in the Spring of 2004. "Last Train Home" is the second Lostprophets single to ever chart in the U.S., the first one being "Shinobi vs. Dragon Ninja". The song won the Kerrang! Award for Best Single.

Johnny Loftus of AllMusic said, "'Last Train Home' was an absolute masterpiece of a single mixing board surgery, flawlessly, brazenly binding the properties of three of California's most marketable acts into one monster of an alternative rock anthem, sung by a bunch of immaculately T-shirted dudes from Pontypridd. Beginning with an instrumental run through its unstoppable chorus, the song drifted into faraway echoes of piano as vocalist Ian Watkins emoted vaguely meaningful lyrics like 'Love was once apart / But now it's disappeared.'"

Kirk Miller of Rolling Stone said "Last Train Home" is "one of the catchiest hard-rock songs to hit the radio in the past three years. Singer Ian Watkins has Mike Patton's croon/scream down cold, and his group deftly applies FNM's anything-goes approach: equal parts thrash riffs, symphonic keyboards and moody jazz intervals."

"Last Train Home" was also the song which introduced Geoff Rickly to Lostprophets. Rickly would go on to form No Devotion with the other members after Watkins' conviction in 2013.

Music video
The music video was directed by Brian Scott Weber and was shot in various Downtown Los Angeles locations in November 2003. Ian Watkins wears a Pittsburgh Strikers (an amateur football club in Western Pennsylvania) T-shirt during the video.

Track listing

Personnel
 Ian Watkins – lead vocals
 Lee Gaze – lead guitar
 Mike Lewis – rhythm guitar
 Stuart Richardson – bass guitar
 Mike Chiplin – drums, percussion
 Jamie Oliver – synth, turntables, samples, vocals
 Benji Madden – writer, additional group vocals
 Billy Martin - additional group vocals

Charts

References

2004 singles
Lostprophets songs
UK Independent Singles Chart number-one singles
2004 songs
Song recordings produced by Eric Valentine
Columbia Records singles